Belize competed at the 2015 Pan American Games in Toronto, Ontario, Canada from July 10 to 26, 2015.

The Belizean team consisting of three (two men and one woman) athletes in two sports (athletics and triathlon) was announced on July 4, 2015. This occasion marked the country's debut in the sport of triathlon. Triathlete Amed Figueroa was the flagbearer for the team during the opening ceremony.

Belize did not medal at the games, with sprinter Kaina Martinez finishing with the nation's highest placement (23rd place) in the women's 100 metres track and field event.

Competitors
The following table lists Belize's delegation per sport and gender.

Athletics

Belize received two wildcards (one man and one woman).

Track events

Triathlon

Belize received a wildcard to enter one male triathlete. This marked the country's debut in the sport at the Pan American Games.

Men

See also
Belize at the 2016 Summer Olympics

References

Nations at the 2015 Pan American Games
P
2015